Following the historic Lindbergh kidnapping (the abduction and murder of Charles Lindbergh's toddler son), the United States Congress passed a federal kidnapping statute—known as the Federal Kidnapping Act, (a)(1) (popularly known as the Lindbergh Law, or Little Lindbergh Law)—which was intended to let federal authorities step in and pursue kidnappers once they had crossed state lines with their victim. The act became law in 1932. In 1934, the act was amended to provide exception for parents who abduct their own minor children and made a death sentence possible in cases where the victim was not released unharmed.

The theory behind the Lindbergh Law was that federal law enforcement intervention was necessary because state and local law enforcement officers could not effectively pursue kidnappers across state lines. Since federal law enforcement, such as FBI agents and U.S. Marshals, have national law enforcement authority, Congress believed they could do a much more effective job of dealing with kidnappings than could state, county, and local authorities.

Only one person was executed for a federal kidnapping conviction in a case where the victim did not die. Under the current statute, the victim must die for the crime to become a capital offense. Barring a permitted departure from federal guidelines, kidnapping resulting in death now carries a mandatory life sentence if the perpetrator is an adult. In addition, the law mandates a minimum of 20 years in prison if the victim is a minor and the perpetrator is an adult and not a family member.

Several states implemented their own versions of this law, known as "Little Lindbergh" laws, covering acts of kidnapping that did not cross state lines. In some states, if the victim was physically harmed in any manner, the crime qualified for capital punishment. This was what occurred in the Caryl Chessman case in California. Following the April 8, 1968 decision by the United States Supreme Court in United States v. Jackson, kidnapping alone no longer constitutes a capital offense.

Notable convictions
 Thomas Robert Limerick, sentenced to life in prison for 1935 for the kidnapping of three people during a bank robbery. He was killed during an escape attempt from the Alcatraz Federal Penitentiary in 1938.
 Arthur Gooch, executed in 1936 for the kidnapping of police officers R.N. Baker and H.R. Marks in Texas, before releasing them alive in Oklahoma. He is the only person executed for a federal kidnapping conviction in a case where the victim(s) did not die. The crime became a capital offense when Baker was badly injured after being shoved into a glass case, which then broke. Gooch's accomplice, Ambrose Nix, was killed while resisting arrest on December 23, 1934.
 Samuel Shockley, sentenced to life in prison in 1938 for the kidnapping of Mr. and Mrs. D. F. Pendley during a bank robbery. He was later convicted of murder for his participation in the Battle of Alcatraz, sentenced to death, and executed in 1948.
 John Henry Seadlund, executed in 1938 for the kidnapping and murder of Charles Sherman Ross. Seadlund also killed his accomplice, 19-year-old James Atwood Gray.
 Clarence Carnes, sentenced to 99 years in prison in 1945 for the kidnapping of Jack Nance while he was a fugitive. At the time, he had been serving a life sentence for murder in Oklahoma. Carnes was later convicted of murder for his involvement in the Battle of Alcatraz and received another life sentence. He was the only surviving participant to be spared execution, after federal officers testified on his behalf, saying he had rejected orders to kill them. Carnes was paroled in 1973, but returned to prison for parole violations. He died in prison in 1988.
 Miran Edgar Thompson, sentenced to 99 years in prison in 1945 for the kidnapping of Betty Jim Shelton after killing a police officer in Texas. He was then given a life sentence in Texas for murdering the officer after the jury spared him from execution. Thompson was later convicted of murder for his participation in the Battle of Alcatraz, sentenced to death, and executed in 1948.
 William Edward Cook, sentenced to 300 years in prison in 1951 after pleading guilty to the kidnapping and murder of a family of five, over the objections of the prosecution, who had wanted him executed. After learning that Cook would become eligible for parole in 20 years, the public demanded that he stand trial for another murder he committed in California. He was convicted of that murder, sentenced to death, and executed in 1952.
 Carl Austin Hall and Bonnie Emily Heady, executed in 1953 for the kidnapping and murder of Bobby Greenlease
 George and Michael Krull, sentenced to life in prison in 1956 for the kidnapping and rape of Sunie Jones. They were also federally prosecuted for the rape specifically, since it occurred in a national park. The Krulls were both sentenced to death on this charge, and executed in 1957.
 Walter Hill, sentenced to 25 years in prison for the kidnapping and robbery of Arthur Phillips. Hill, who had a prior murder conviction, had his sentence extended by five years after being convicted of voluntary manslaughter for fatally stabbing a fellow inmate. Hill was paroled in 1975, and committed a triple murder in Alabama in 1977. He was sentenced to death in that case and executed in 1997.
 Victor Harry Feguer, executed in 1963 for the kidnapping and murder of Doctor Edward Bartels.
 Robert Lee Willie and Joseph Vaccaro, sentenced to life in prison for the kidnapping and attempted murder of Mark Allen Brewster, and the kidnapping and rape of Debbie Cuevas. Willie and Vaccaro were later sentenced to death and life in prison, respectively, on a state murder charge in Louisiana. Willie, who pleaded guilty to two additional murders while on death row, was executed in 1984.
 Ming Sen Shiue, sentenced to life in prison in 1980 for the kidnapping and rape of Mary Stauffer, and the kidnapping of her daughter, Elizabeth. He was denied mandatory release and declared a dangerous sexual predator in 2010.
 Alton Coleman and Debra Brown, serial killers each sentenced to 20 years in prison in 1985 for kidnapping Oline Carmical. Coleman and Brown were later sentenced to death on state murder charges. Coleman received death sentences in Ohio, Indiana, and Illinois, while Brown received death sentences in Ohio and Indiana. Coleman was executed in Ohio in 2002, but Brown later had her sentence commuted to life in prison without parole.
 Genaro Ruiz Camacho, sentenced to life without parole in 1991 for the kidnapping and murder of Evellyn Banks and her son, Andre Banks. Camacho was later sentenced to death on state murder charges in Texas and executed in 1998.
 Donald Leroy Evans, serial killer sentenced to life without parole in 1991 for the kidnapping, rape, and murder of Beatrice Louise Routh. Evans was later sentenced to death on state murder charges in Mississippi. He was stabbed to death by a fellow death row inmate in 1999.
 Larry Hall, suspected serial killer sentenced to life without parole in 1995 for the kidnapping and murder of 16-year-old Jessica Roach. Hall is suspected of dozens of murders in multiple states.
 Cary Stayner, serial killer sentenced to life without parole in 2000 for the kidnapping, rape, and murder of Joie Ruth Armstrong. Cary was later sentenced to death on state murder charges in California.
Louis Jones Jr., executed in 2003 for the kidnapping, rape, and murder of Tracie McBride.
Alfonso Rodriguez Jr., sentenced to death in 2007 for the kidnapping, rape, and murder of Dru Sjodin. His death sentence was overturned in 2021 and he is currently awaiting a new sentencing hearing.
James Ford Seale, sentenced to life in prison in 2007 for the kidnapping and murder of two young black men as a Ku Klux Klan member in 1964. Died in prison in 2011.
Brian David Mitchell and Wanda Barzee, sentenced to life without parole and 15 years, respectively, for kidnapping and repeatedly raping 14-year-old Elizabeth Smart while holding her in captivity for approximately nine months.
Annugetta Pettway, sentenced to 11 years in prison in 2012 after pleading guilty to kidnapping Carlina White as an infant and raising her as her own child. Released in 2021.
Joseph Edward Duncan, serial killer sentenced to death in 2008 for the kidnapping, rape, and murder of Dylan Groene. He died on death row in 2021 before he could be executed.
Brendt Allen Christensen, sentenced to life without parole in 2019 for the kidnapping, rape, and murder of Yingying Zhang, after a jury spared him from execution.
Wesley Ira Purkey, executed in 2020 for the kidnapping, rape, and murder of Jennifer Long.
Lezmond Charles Mitchell, executed in 2020 for the carjacking, kidnapping, and murder of lyce Slim and Tiffany Lee.
Keith Dwayne Nelson, executed in 2020 for the kidnapping, rape, and murder of Pamela Butler.
Orlando Cordia Hall, Bruce Carneil Webster, Demetrius Kenyon Hall, Steven Christopher Beckley, and Marvin Terrance Holloway, prosecuted for the kidnapping, rape, and murder of Lisa Rene. Orlando Hall, the ringleader, was executed in 2020, and Bruce Webster had his death sentence commuted to life without parole in 2019 after he was found to be intellectually disabled. Demetrius Hall, Steven Beckley, and Marvin Holloway all pleaded guilty and testified against Orlando Hall and Bruce Webster in exchange for leniency, receiving prison sentences ranging from 15 to 30 years, and have since been released from prison. Although Beckley pleaded guilty to kidnapping resulting in death, he avoided a mandatory life sentence since prosecutors gave him and the others "substantial assistance" specifications due to their cooperation.
Lisa Marie Montgomery, executed in 2021 for the kidnapping of Bobbie Jo Stinnett's unborn child. Montgomery cut the baby out of Stinnett's womb and left Stinnett to die.
Dustin Higgs and Willis Haynes, prosecuted for the kidnapping and murder of Tamika Black, Tanji Jackson, and Mishann Chinn. They were also tried on federal first degree murder charges since the killings occurred on federal property. Higgs was executed in 2021 and Haynes received a life sentence. A third man who was present, Victor Gloria, pleaded guilty to being an accessory after the fact and received a 7-year sentence in exchange for testifying against Higgs and Hayes.
Javier Enrique Da Silva Rojas, sentenced to 30 years in prison in 2021 after pleading guilty to the kidnapping and murder of his ex-girlfriend, Valerie Reyes, by stuffing her in a suitcase, causing her to suffocate.

References

External links
 

1932 in American law
72nd United States Congress
Kidnapping in the United States
Kidnapping Act
1932 in the United States